Ioannis Frangoudis (1863 – 19 October 1916) was a Greek soldier, athlete and Hellenic Army officer who reached the rank of Colonel. He also competed in the 1896 Summer Olympics in Athens as a shooter. Frangoudis is the only Greek athlete who has won a gold, a silver and a bronze medal in a single Olympic.

Biography 
Frangoudis hailed from Limassol, Cyprus, which was under British control at the time, but was born in Zakynthos, where his father worked as a consul.  He graduated from the Hellenic Military Academy in 1885, and worked his way up the ranks of the Greek army, being a captain at the time of the 1896 Olympics. After the Greco-Turkish war of 1897, he had become a colonel, and a friend of King George I of Greece. Frangoudis is also known for having been present at the assassination of the King, and for having taken the his assassin, Alexandros Schinas, into custody. 

Frangoudis died by an electrocution accident in 19 October 1916, while visiting New York City for an ammo supply mission of the Greek army.

Olympics Career 

Frangoudis competed in four of the five shooting events as well as serving as secretary of the Sub-Committee for Shooting.

He began his sole rifle event, the free rifle, with a lead in the competition after the first string of 10 shots.  However, his shooting was inconsistent and his second and fourth strings were far below the scores of his first and third strings. Frangoudis finished second behind Georgios Orfanidis, with 1,312 points to his countryman's 1,583. Viggo Jensen in third place was only 7 points behind Frangoudis.

In the rapid fire pistol, Frangoudis was the victor, defeating Orfanidis, along with two other competitors, 344-249.  He added another top three finish in the free pistol, behind Sumner Paine (silver medallist in the military pistol) and Holger Nielsen (bronze medallist in the rapid fire pistol). Frangoudis also competed in the military pistol, finishing fourth.

References

External links

Shooters at the 1896 Summer Olympics
19th-century sportsmen
Greek male sport shooters
ISSF pistol shooters
Cypriot emigrants to Greece
Greek Cypriot people
Olympic shooters of Greece
Olympic gold medalists for Greece
Olympic silver medalists for Greece
Olympic bronze medalists for Greece
Hellenic Army officers
Olympic medalists in shooting
1863 births
1916 deaths
Sportspeople from Limassol
Medalists at the 1896 Summer Olympics
Accidental deaths in New York (state)
Date of birth missing